The 1st Delaware Infantry Regiment, later known as the 1st Delaware Veteran Infantry Regiment was a United States volunteer infantry regiment raised for Union Army service in the American Civil War. Part of the II Corps it served in the Eastern Theater of the American Civil War.

Organisation and Remusterings

90-Day Volunteers
When the Civil War began in April 1861, there were only about 16,000 men in the U.S. Army, and many Southern soldiers and officers were already resigning and joining the new Confederate States Army. With this drastic shortage of men in the army, President Abraham Lincoln called on the states to raise a force of 75,000 volunteers for three months to put down the insurrection in the South. Accordingly, the 1st Delaware Infantry Regiment was raised at Wilmington, Delaware, on May 22, 1861, and mustered into Federal service on May 28. The regiment comprised 37 officers and 742 enlisted men under the command of Colonel Henry H. Lockwood.

The original Field & Staff were:

Colonel: Henry H. Lockwood 
Lieutenant Colonel: John W. Andrews 
Major: Robert Lamott 
Surgeon: R. W. Johnson 
Assistant-Surgeon: James Knight 
Adjutant: Lieutenant W. P. Seville 
Quartermaster: H. Alderdice

The original Company Commanders were:

Co. A (Delaware Blues): Cpt. Evans Watson 
Co. B: Cot. Charles Lamott 
Co. C: Cpt. James Bare 
Co. D: Cpt. James Green 
Co. E (Wilmington Rifles): Cpt. Robert Mulligan 
Co. F: Cpt. Thomas Crossley 
Co. G (Sussex Volunteers): Cpt. J. Rodney Layton 
Co. H: Cpt. S.H. Jenskins 
Co. I: Cpt. James Leonard 
Co. K: Cpt. Smith

The regiment was attached to the command of Major General John Dix ('Dix's Command", Department of the Potomac) and assigned to duty along the line of the Philadelphia, Wilmington and Baltimore Railroad. The regiment mustered out on August 30, 1861.

3-Years Volunteers
On July 22, 1861, the United States Congress authorized a volunteer army of 500,000 men. When in August the enlistment term for the regiment ended a new 1st Regiment was raised for a term of three years at Wilmington, Delaware, between September 10 and October 19, 1861. This time the regiment had 37 officers and 846 enlisted men under the command of Colonel John W. Andrews.  

The Field & Staff were:

Colonel: John W. Andrews 
Lieutenant Colonel: 0. Hopkinson 
Major: Thomas A. Smyth 
Surgeon: D. W. Maull 
Chaplain: Thomas G. Murphey 
Assistant-Surgeon: S. D. Marshall 
Adjutant: First Lieutenant W. P. Saville 
Quartermaster: First Lieutenant T. Y. England

Sergeant-Major: James Lewis 
Quartermaster's Sergeant: Frank Wilson 
Commissary Sergeant: Charles S. Sehocffer 
Hospital Steward: Archibald D. O'Mera 
Drum-Major: Patrick Dooley

The Company Commanders were:

Co. A: Cpt. Evans S. Watson 
Co. B: Cpt. James Leonard 
Co. C: Cpt. Neal Ward 
Co. D: Cpt. Enoch J. Smithers 
Co. E: Cpt. Edward P. Harris 
Co. F: Cpt. Daniel Woodall 
Co. G: Cpt. Allen Shortledge 
Co. H: Cpt. John B. Tanner 
Co. I: Cpt. Charles Lesper 
Co. K: Cpt. Thomas Crassley

Veteran Volunteers
On July 1, 1864, the 3 years enlistment would have ended and the regiment would be mustered out. Instead in July 1863 the men, still having nine months of their enlistment left, got the chance to reenlist for another 3 years from that date. On December 19, 1863, three quarters of the regiment reenlisted. The 1st Delaware was upgraded to veteran status as 1st Delaware Veteran Infantry Regiment. The 1st Delaware Infantry claimed to be first regiment in the Union to receive the coveted veteran status.

In April 1864 the 1st Delaware absorbed the remnants of the 2nd Delaware Infantry Regiment, a number of recruits and veterans with two complete companies.

Service and engagements

1861
 Raised at Wilmington—May 22, 1861 
 Mustered into Federal service—May 28
 Col. Lockwood was promoted to Brigadier and was replaced by Col. John W. Andrews—August 8
 Reorganized and trained at Wilmington—September 10-October 19
 Moved to Fort Monroe, Virginia—October 20–21

1862
 Camp Harrison, Virginia—until May 
 Occupation of Norfolk, Virginia—May 10 
 Battle of Antietam—September 16–17
 Garrison of Harpers Ferry—September 22-October 30 
 Movement to Falmouth, Virginia—October 30-November 17
 Battle of Fredericksburg—December 12–15

1863
 Mud March—January 20–22
 At Falmouth, Virginia—January–April
 Col. Andrews resigned and was replaced by Col. Thomas Smyth—February 7
 Battle of Chancellorsville—May 1–6
 Gettysburg Campaign—June–July
 Battle of Gettysburg—July 1–3
 Pursuit of Lee to Manassas Gap—July 5–24
 Duty along the Rappahannock River and Rapidan River—July–October
 Battle of Bristoe Station—October 14
 Mine Run Campaign—November 26-December 2
 Regiment remustered as 1st Delaware Veteran Volunteer Infantry Regiment—December

1864
 Overland Campaign—May 3-June 15
 Battle of the Wilderness—May 5–7
 Battle of Spotsylvania Court House—May 12–21
 Battle of North Anna—May 23–26
 On line of the Pamunkey May 26–28 
 Battle of Totopotomoy Creek—May 28–31
 Battle of Cold Harbor—June 1–12 
 Before Petersburg—June 16–18
 Siege of Petersburg—June 16, 1864, to April 2, 1865
 Received remnants of the 2nd Delaware Infantry Regiment—April
 Battle of Jerusalem Plank Road—June 22–23, 1864
 First Battle of Deep Bottom—July 27–28
 Battle of the Crater (in reserve position)—July 30
 Second Battle of Deep Bottom—August 13–20
 Ream's Station—August 25
 Yellow House—October 1–5
 Battle of Boydton Plank Road—October 27-2
 Col. Smyth was promoted and was replaced by Col. Woodall—October

1865
 Battle of Hatcher's Run—February 5–7, 1865
 Watkins' House—March 25
 Appomattox Campaign—March 28-April 9
 Boydton Road and White Oak Ridge—March 29–31
 Crow's House—March 31
 Third Battle of Petersburg—April 2
 In pursuit of the Army of Northern Virginia—April 3–9
 Battle of Sailor's Creek—April 6
 Battle of High Bridge and Farmville—April 7
 Battle of Appomattox Court House—April 9
 Received the veterans of the 3rd Delaware Infantry Regiment—April
 At Burkesville—until May 2
 March to Washington, D.C.—May 2–12
 Grand Review of the Armies—May 23
 At Washington, D.C.—until July
 Mustered out of Federal service—July 12, 1865

Other Regimental Statistics

Commanding Officers

Casualties

At the Battle of Antietam the regiment suffered 36 men killed and mortally wounded, and 182 men wounded, being 30.8% from a total strength of 708.

At the Battle of Fredericksburg the regiment lost 10 killed, 74 wounded and 9 missing.

At the Battle of Chancellorsville the regiment lost 6 killed, 33 wounded and 10 missing.

At the Battle of Gettysburg in 1863 the regiment suffered 10 killed, 54 wounded, and 13 missing, being 31% from a total strength of 251. It also had 4 different regimental commanders during the battle.

Throughout the war the regiment suffered 12 officers and 146 enlisted men killed and mortally wounded, and 3 officers and 118 enlisted men killed by disease.

Medal of Honor

Four men were awarded the Medal of Honor while serving with the 1st Delaware.

Battle of Antietam
Second Lieutenant Charles B. Tanner of Company H earned the medal by saving the regimental flag after the entire nine-man color guard was killed or wounded. Tanner himself was wounded three times in the battle.
Battle of Gettysburg
Private Bernard McCarren of Company C was awarded the medal for capturing a Confederate battle flag.
Private John B. Maberry of Company F was awarded the medal for capturing a Confederate battle flag.
Captain James P. Postles of Company A received the medal for voluntarily carrying a message under heavy fire at Gettysburg.

See also
 List of Delaware Civil War units
 Delaware in the Civil War
 1st Delaware Regiment – a Delaware regiment from the American Revolutionary War
 198th Signal Battalion (United States) – Unit descended from 1st Delaware, article has full lineage

References

Sources & External links

Units and formations of the Union Army from Delaware
Gibraltar Brigade
Military units and formations established in 1861
Military units and formations disestablished in 1865
1861 establishments in Delaware